This is a list of people depicted on the postage stamps of Hong Kong. British Hong Kong issued stamps from 1862 to 1999. Stamps of Hong Kong were then issued under the control of China. The date when the person depicted first appeared on stamps is listed in parentheses.

History

Established in August 1841, the Postal Department (later renamed to Hongkong Post) on 8 December 1862 published its inaugural postage stamp featuring Queen Victoria's image, which Ferdinand Joubert did the engraving of. The department issued seven versions of the stamp. In the period between 1862 and 1935, Hong Kong published only definitive stamps and issued new stamps every time there was a new British monarch who presided over Hong Kong. The stamps featured images of the monarchs such as King Edward VII in 1903, King George V in 1912, and King George VI in 1938. The Postal Department released the first stamp featuring Queen Elizabeth II on 5 January 1954. It subsequently released four differently designed stamps with her image. In 1894, the Postal Department featured the Scottish missionary James Legge on a postage stamp, making him the first individual not from the British royal family to be shown on a stamp.

The Postal Department released commemorative stamps less frequently and in tinier batches. The commemorative stamps celebrated events and people. They used the stamps to celebrate royal events such as the Wedding of Princess Anne and Mark Phillips that featured the couple and Silver Jubilee of Elizabeth II that featured Elizabeth II. To celebrate the 1974 Hong Kong Arts Festival, they used stamps to highlight Chinese culture and attract foreigners attendees even though the festival was not exclusively focused on Chinese culture. The stamp architect selected Cantonese opera masks to appear on the stamp. Each mask had a person who was legendary or was from ancient times. The list included the mythical Monkey King, the military general Guan Yu, and the judge Bao Zheng.

In the 1980s, the Postal Department began releasing commemorative stamps featuring celebrities. In November 1995, to commemorate movie stars, Hong Kong released a collection of four stamps titled "Hong Kong Movie Stars" featuring Bruce Lee, Leung Sing Poh, Yam Kim-fai, and Lin Dai in 1995. According to the scholar Anxi Dai, "These movie stars were already household names at that time, and had even become famous overseas." The stamps' denominations were HK$1.20, HK$2.10, HK$2.60 and HK$5. Owing to the stamps' popularity, the Postal Department released a second collection of four movie star stamps in 2001, this time featuring on each stamp one male and one female movie star who had been great partners in movies. The stamps' denominations were HK$1.30, HK$2.50, HK$3.10, and HK$5.00. In June 2001, the Hongkong Post issued a collection of stamps titled "My Wishes" featuring athletes and stars from the literary and art arenas who were from mainland China, Hong Kong, and Taiwan. The goal was to support the Beijing bid for the 2008 Summer Olympics. The people featured on the stamps included Zhang Yimou, Ge You, Mao Amin, Gong Li, Yang Lan, Zhao Wei, and Zhang Ziyi. On 8 November 2005, the Hongkong Post released a set of stamps in a collection titled "Hong Kong Pop Stars". It commemorated five Hong singers who had died: Danny Chan], Leslie Cheung, Anita Mui, Roman Tam, and Wong Ka Kui.

After the Handover of Hong Kong, the Hongkong Post released stamps that commemorated historical Chinese figures with significance to Hong Kong like Sun Yat-sen and Deng Xiaoping instead of current political leaders. In the first twenty years of the 21st century, Sun appeared numerous times on the stamps. The appearances included 12 November 2006 and 12 November 2016 to commemorate his 140th and 150th birthdays, respectively. Sun spent some of his formative years in Hong Kong, where he formed his revolutionary ideas that later led to the overthrow of the Qing dynasty. Deng was the leader who had proposed the one country, two systems principle of how to govern Hong Kong.

A 
 Anne, Princess Royal (1973)

B 
 Robert Baden-Powell, 1st Baron Baden-Powell (2007), a stamp containing his portrait was issued on 1 March 2007 to celebrate the centennial of his founding of the Scout Movement. Yi Dal-wing designed the stamp.
 Bao Zheng (1974)

C 
 Charles, Prince of Wales (1972), a stamp was published in 1981 to commemorate the wedding of Prince Charles and Lady Diana Spencer, and after their inaugural Hong Kong trip a second stamp was published in 1989 to commemorate it.
 Cai Yuanpei (2011)
 Danny Chan (2005)
 Leslie Cheung (2005)
  (2001), actor
 Winston Churchill (1966), the 24 January 1966 stamp showed Churchill and St Paul's Cathedral during the Second World War.

D 
 Deng Xiaoping (2004), a collection of two stamps was released on 22 August 2004 to celebrate the centennial of his birth.

E 

 Edward VII (1903)
 Queen Elizabeth The Queen Mother (1937)
 Elizabeth II (1953)

F 
 Wong-Nui Fung (2001)

G 
 Ge You (2001)
 George V (1912), a stamp featuring the king was released on 6 May 1935 to commemorate his his Silver Jubilee.
 George VI (1937)
 Gong Li (2001)
 Guan Yu (1974)

H 
 Prince Harry (1985)
 Huang Xing (2011)

L 
 Bruce Lee (1995)
 James Legge (1894), he was the first individual not from the British royal family to be shown on a stamp. Legge was shown on a stamp again in 1994.
 Leung Sing Poh (1995)
 Lin Dai (1995)

M 
 Mak Bing-wing (2001), actor
 Mao Amin (2001)
 Anita Mui (2005)

N 
  (2001), actor

P 
 Yin Pak (2001), actress
 Prince Philip, Duke of Edinburgh (1972), a commemorative stamp was issued to celebrate the 25th anniversary of his wedding with Queen Elizabeth II. Another stamp was issued in 1975 to commemorate his visit with Elizabeth II to Hong Kong that year.
 Puankhequa (1986), merchant
 Mark Phillips (1973)

S 
 Diana, Princess of Wales (1981)
 Song Jiaoren (2011)
 Sun Ma Sze Tsang (2001)
 Sun Yat-sen (2006)

T 
 Roman Tam (2005)
 Tang Bik-wan (2001)

V 
 Queen Victoria (1862)

W 
 Prince William, Duke of Cambridge (1984)
 William the Conqueror (1935), a five-cent stamp bearing the king's stern expression and Windsor Castle was released on 6 May 1935 to commemorate the Silver Jubilee of George V.
 Wong Ka Kui (2005)
 Man-lei Wong (2001), actor

Y 
 Yam Kim-fai (1995)
 Yang Lan (2001)

Z 
 Zhang Binglin (2011)
 Zhang Yimou (2001)
 Zhang Ziyi
 Zhao Wei (2001)
 Zheng He (2005), on 28 June 2005, the Hongkong Post issued a set of stamps bearing his image to commemorate the 600th anniversary of his expedition to the West.

References

Bibliography

Further reading 
 

Hong Kong
Stamps